Diary is Japanese Pop/R&B singer Thelma Aoyama's debut album. It was released on March 26, 2008 in Japan.

Track listing
 "My Beginning"
 "Soba ni Iru ne feat. SoulJa (そばにいるね; I'm by Your Side)"
 "One Way"
 "My dear friend"
 "Last Letter"
 "Rhythm (リズム)"
 "Good Time Remix feat. Miku from Ya-Kyim"
 "Higher"
 "Paradise"
 "This Day feat. Dohzi-T"
 "Kono Mama de (このままで; Like This)"
 "Anata ni Aete Yokatta (あなたに会えてよかった; It Was Nice Knowing You)"
 "Mama e (ママへ; To Mom)"
 "Diary"

Charts
Oricon Sales Chart (Japan)

References

External links 
Thelma Aoyama DIARY - Universal J

2008 debut albums
Thelma Aoyama albums
Universal J albums